Apostolepis striata is a species of snake in the family Colubridae. It is endemic to Brazil.

References 

striata
Reptiles described in 2004
Reptiles of Brazil